The Capelobo is a mythical creature from Brazilian mythology. Its legend is very common, especially in the states of Maranhão, Amazonas, and Pará. It is believed to have arisen among the indigenous peoples of the northern region of Brazil.

Etymology 
The name Capelobo is a fusion of an indigenous Brazilian word, cape, meaning broken bone, and the Portuguese word , meaning wolf.

Legends 
The Capelobo has two forms, an animal form and a humanoid form. In its animal form, it is like a tapir with attributes of a dog. In its humanoid form, it has the head of a giant anteater (or a tapir or dog, depending on the version of the myth), the body of a human, and rounded, bottle-shaped legs. It has lots of hair on its body, and runs through forests near human settlements in floodplain regions. It is sometimes described as having a single leg.

It is known to hunt newborn puppies and kittens, but will kill humans by squeezing them and drinking their blood and eating their brains if given the opportunity. The only way to defeat it is by shooting it in the navel. In order to hunt humans, it produces a powerful scream which attracts them into the woods while also scaring them. It is also said that some people will transform into Capelobos with age.

See also 
List of vampiric creatures in folklore

References 

Brazilian legendary creatures
Indigenous South American legendary creatures